Pyrausta pellicalis is a species of moth in the family Crambidae. It is found in Spain and North Africa, including Algeria.

References

Moths described in 1871
pellicalis
Moths of Europe
Moths of Africa